Seekopf (German, 'lake head' or 'lake peak') may refer to :

Mountains

Austria
 Seekopf (Allgäu Alps), a mountain of the Allgäu Alps, Vorarlberg

 Vorderer Seekopf, a peak in the Venediger Group in the Central Eastern Alps
 Wolayer Seekopf, a summit in the Carnic and Gailtal Alps

Germany
 Seekopf (Forbach), in the Northern Black Forest northeast of the Hornisgrinde, Baden-Württemberg
 Seekopf (Seebach), in the Northern Black Forest southeast of the Hornisgrinde, Baden-Württemberg
 Großer Seekopf, in the Daumen Group the Allgäu Alps, Bavaria
 Kleiner Seekopf, in the Daumen Group the Allgäu Alps, Bavaria

Antarctica
 Mount Seekopf, in the Gruber Mountains

See also
 Seekofel, a mountain in the Dolomites in Italy
 Seeköpfle, a mountain of Bavaria, Germany